Thomasia is a genus of thirty-one species of flowering plants in the family Malvaceae. Plants in this genus are small shrubs that are endemic to the south-west of Western Australia, apart from T. petalocalyx that is native to Victoria and South Australia. The leaves are simple with leaf-like stipules at the base of the petiole, the flowers bisexual with five papery, petal-like sepals, usually five petals and five stamens opposite the petals. The fruit is a capsule covered with star-like hairs.

Taxonomy
The genus Thomasia was first formally described in 1821 by Jaques Étienne Gay in Mémoires du Muséum d'Histoire Naturelle. The name Thomasia honours Pierre Thomas, his son Abraham, and Abraham's sons Philippe, Louis and Emmanuel, a family of Swiss plant collectors.

Species list
The following is a listed of Thomasia species recognised by the Australian Plant Census as at December 2020:
Thomasia angustifolia Steud. - narrow-leaved thomasia
Thomasia brachystachys Turcz.  
Thomasia cognata Steud.  
Thomasia dielsii E.Pritz.  
Thomasia discolor Steud.  
Thomasia foliosa J.Gay  
Thomasia × formosa Paust  
Thomasia gardneri Paust - Mount Holland thomasia
Thomasia glabripetala S.J.Patrick 
Thomasia grandiflora Lindl. - large-flowered thomasia
Thomasia macrocalyx Steud.
Thomasia macrocarpa Endl. - large-fruited thomasia
Thomasia microphylla Paust
Thomasia montana Steud. - hill thomasia
Thomasia multiflora E.Pritz.
Thomasia paniculata Lindl.
Thomasia pauciflora Lindl. - few-flowered thomasia
Thomasia petalocalyx F.Muell. - paper flower
Thomasia purpurea (Dryand.) J.Gay 
Thomasia pygmaea (Turcz.) Benth. - tiny thomasia
Thomasia quercifolia (Andrews) J.Gay  - oak-leaved thomasia
Thomasia rhynchocarpa Turcz.
Thomasia rugosa Turcz. - wrinkled leaf thomasia
Thomasia rulingioides Steud.
Thomasia sarotes<small> Turcz.</small>Thomasia solanacea (Sims) J.GayThomasia stelligera (Turcz.) Benth.Thomasia tenuivestita F.Muell. Thomasia tremandroides PaustThomasia triloba Turcz.Thomasia triphylla'' (Labill.) J.Gay

References

External links
Malvaceae info: Thomasia gallery
FloraBase: the Western Australian Flora: Thomasia

 
Malvaceae genera